An election for the members of the Constitutional Convention was held in Chile between 15 and 16 May 2021. This election was called after 78% of voters in the 2020 national plebiscite voted to write a new Constitution through this method.

After massive protests and riots sparked in October 2019, an agreement was reached on 15 November 2019 between several political parties to start the process to write a new Constitution. In case the first referendum was approved (originally scheduled for 26 April 2021), a special election would be called to select the members of the Constitutional Convention. This election was originally scheduled for 25 October 2020, six months after the first referendum. However, due to the impact of the COVID-19 pandemic in Chile, the first referendum was moved to 25 October and the eventual election of the members of the Convention was scheduled for 11 April 2021. The extension of the pandemic forced the government to change the date of the election twice later: in March 2021, the election was extended to two days (10 and 11 April) and later, it was postponed by one month to 15 and 16 May 2021 due to a rise in COVID-19 cases.

This was the first time that Chilean citizens were able to vote for the members of the body created to write the Constitution. Although based originally in the system to elect the 155 members of the Chamber of Deputies, this election process established several changes. For the first time, 17 reserved seats were established for the 10 official indigenous groups. Also, different mechanisms in the inscription of candidates and the election system itself were designed to ensure gender parity in the Convention, being the first assembly of this kind in the world with equal representation of men and women.

The election's results were considered a surprise and a complete rearrangement of the political system in Chile established since the end of Pinochet's dictatorship in 1990. A large share of elected members (65 out of 155) were independent candidates organized in new lists (26 from the anti-establishment People's List, 22 others and 17 indigenous representatives). Although Chile Vamos, the governing alliance, was the most voted list in the country, it represented the lowest results in Chilean modern history for right-wing politics, not even reaching the third of members needed to veto in the Convention. The successor to Concertación, the main centre-left alliance, finished in fourth place, being surpassed by the alliance made by the leftist Communist Party and the Broad Front. The List of the People, an anti-establishment list of independent candidates, finished in third place.

Electoral system

The Constitutional Convention is composed of 155 members directly elected in this election: 138 by the electorate at large and 17 were reserved for citizens identified as indigenous.

The 138 at-large members were chosen in 28 constituencies of between three and eight seats by open list proportional representation. The constituencies are the same used for the election of the 155 members of the Chamber of Deputies. However, the districts with the largest number of indigenous people (according to the last census) and more than 3 seats were reduced by one seat to allocate the reserved indigenous seats. Candidates should be at least 18 years old and not have been previously convicted of a felony. Candidates could be presented by political parties or alliances of parties; in the case of independents candidates, they could participate as single independent candidates (gathering signatures of other independent citizens equal to 0.2% of voters in the last parliamentary election) or as a list (in this case, 0.5% of voters).

Seats were allocated using the D'Hondt method, just like in the parliamentary elections. In April 2020, a constitutional reform made some adjustments to that system to ensure equal representation of men and women in the Constitutional Convention. In case there is no gender equality in a constituency, the least-voted elected candidate of the over-represented gender will be replaced by a different-sex member in the same list or political party of the replaced candidate. Also, all alliances and parties had to present a list of candidates alternating their gender, starting with a woman, followed by a man, and so on.

The 17 seats reserved for Chilean indigenous peoples were allocated proportionally, depending on the number of people identifying in the 2017 census: 7 seats for Mapuche, 2 for Aymara, and 1 each for the Diaguita, Quechua, Atacameño, Colla, Chango, Rapa Nui, Kawésqar, and Yaghan peoples. Originally, an additional seat was set for the Afro-Chilean tribal group, but the proposal didn't meet the quorum for approval in Congress. Candidates for these seats must have been registered as a member of one of the recognized indigenous groups with CONADI or have an affidavit declaring that, and have to live in one of the designated regions for each group. Citizens identifying as indigenous could choose one of the ballots: the beige for the at-large election or the green for the reserved seats (with different candidates depending on its group). The candidates with the largest number of votes will be elected and, in case there is no gender equality, the least-voted members of the over-represented gender will be replaced by their alternate candidate of the different gender.

Each list also had to present candidates with disabilities at least in 5% of their candidacies. Other proposals to allow more diversity in the Constituent Assembly were rejected, including one to secure 5% of the candidacies to people from gender or sexual minorities or to establish 3 electoral districts (with 8 seats) for Chileans living abroad.

Electoral districts

Contesting parties and coalitions
71 lists of candidates were submitted and approved by the Electoral Service (Servel). Three run on all 16 regions of the country, including the three largest coalitions with parliamentary representation. 2 coalition lists and the 3 parties presented candidates in different regions, but not in all the country. Other 63 lists of independent candidates were presented on a district level; however, some of them congregated on a national level, being The List of the People, Non-Neutral Independents, and Constituent Social Movements, three of the main coalition of independent lists presented in several regions. 28 independent candidates run outside lists, acting as individual lists in each district.

In total, 1278 candidacies were presented for the at-large election.

Results

By alliance/pact

By party

Indigenous seats

Composition 
 Gender: 78 men and 77 women were elected. Due to the corrections applied to ensure gender parity in each constituency, 4 women and 7 men were elected replacing a different-sex member of their own list with a larger number of votes.
Age: The age average of the elected members was 44.5 years. The oldest member was 78 years old at the time of the election, while the youngest was 21 years old.
Occupation: 59 of the elected members are lawyers and additional 7 were law students. 20 elected members were teachers, 9 were engineers and 5 were journalists. 6 elected members were former members of Congress and 9 were former government authorities.
LGBT: At least 7 of the 155 elected members of the Convention declared to be part of a gender or sexual minority.

Members 
Damaris Abarca, Chilean lawyer
Gloria Alvarado, Chilean activist
Amaya Alvez, Chilean lawyer
Adriana Ampuero, Chilean lawyer
Francisca Arauna, Chilean lawyer
Martín Arrau, Chilean engineer
Margarita Letelier Cortés, Chilean entrepreneur
Paola Grandón, Chilean activist

Notes

References

Elections in Chile
Constitutional
Chile
Constitutional
Chilean Constitutional Convention
2019–2020 Chilean protests
Presidency of Sebastián Piñera